Raissa is a female given name. It is a variant of Raisa (given name) popular in Russia and South Asia (as a feminine form of Rais)

People

Mononym
Raissa (singer, born 1971), full name Raissa Khan-Panni, English singer-songwriter 
Raissa (Malaysian-British singer), known for her debut single "Bullying Boys"

Given name
Raissa Santana (b. 1995), Miss Brasil 2016
Raissa Kelly (b. 1976) French singer in Tachelhit
Raissa Calza (1894-1979)  Ukrainian dancer who became a prominent classical archaeologist 
Raissa Myshetskaya, better known as Nadia Boulanger, French musicologist and music teacher
Raïssa Maritain (1883-1960), Russian poet and philosopher who immigrated to France
Raissa Feudjio (b. 1995), Cameroonian footballer
Raïssa Koublitskaïa (1928–2021), Soviet Belarusian agricultural worker and politician
Raissa Venables (b. 1977), American photographer
Raissa Ruus (1942–1986), Estonian middle-distance runner at the 1972 Summer Olympics
Raissa L. Berg (1913-2006), Russian geneticist and evolutionary biologist
Raissa Nitabuch (1859-unknown), Russian pathologist
Raissa Martin (1991), an Australian goalball player  selected to represent Australia at the 2016 Rio Paralympics
Raissa D'Souza Professor of Computer Science and Mechanical Engineering at the University of California
Raissa Gourevitch (b.1984), Russian tennis player
Raïssa Dapina (b. 1995), Senegalese handball player

Other
1137 Raïssa, an asteroid